Johannes Loersfeld (fl. 1525–1528) was a German printer at Erfurt in the Archbishopric of Mayence.

Among his significant editions was the Erfurt Enchiridion, an early Lutheran hymn-book. Loersfeld's edition of 1524 appeared at much the same time as that of his rival Matthes Maler but was probably the first of this work.

Notes

External links
 Loersfeld, Johannes at oclc.org
 

16th-century German businesspeople
German printers
Businesspeople from Erfurt
Reformation in Germany
Year of birth missing
Year of death missing